Yakuza 6: The Song of Life is an action-adventure video game developed by Ryu Ga Gotoku Studio and published by Sega for PlayStation 4. The game is the seventh main entry in the Yakuza series and the final main game to feature Kazuma Kiryu as the primary protagonist, and was released in Japan in December 2016. The English version was released in Southeast Asia in March 2018, and worldwide the following month. Versions for Windows and Xbox One were released in March 2021. The game was followed up by Yakuza Kiwami 2, a remake of the second game, and by Yakuza: Like a Dragon, the next chronological installment, released in 2020.

Gameplay 
Yakuza 6 is an action-adventure game set in an open world environment and played from a third-person perspective. It is similar to that of other Yakuza titles with exploration mixed with arcade style beat 'em up combat with ragdoll physics. Yakuza 6 was the first game in the series to use the new Dragon Engine game engine (later used in Yakuza Kiwami 2, Yakuza: Like a Dragon and the spin-off Judgment series), which overhauls the presentation and combat mechanics compared to past games. It also features an advanced variant of Yakuza 5'''s Dragon Spirit Mode, called Extreme Heat Mode, where Kiryu becomes resistant to knockback as long as his Heat remains, and his combo finishers can turn into Heat actions that take out immense amounts of health. Additionally, as is also later used in Yakuza Kiwami 2, the game categorizes experience points into different types and the player can grant themselves various upgrades by using experience of the correct type; experience points can also be earned by eating at restaurants, though doing this raises the hunger gauge which limits how much food the player can eat and reduces itself with time.

Unlike Yakuza 4, Yakuza 5 and Yakuza 0, Yakuza 6 does not feature any playable characters besides Kiryu himself. Additionally, unlike 0 and Yakuza Kiwami, Kiryu only uses one fighting style. This game features the series staple location of Kamurochō, Tokyo, as well as a new city, Onomichi, Hiroshima Prefecture. Onomichi stands out from other cities in the series in that its name is the same as its real world counterpart, with the area featured in game being a recreation of the city's Shingai district.

Characters
Several renowned actors voice the characters in Yakuza 6. Among them: Takeshi Kitano as Toru Hirose, Shun Oguri as Takumi Someya, Hiroyuki Miyasako as Tsuyoshi Nagumo, Tatsuya Fujiwara as Yuta Usami (Miyasako and Fujiwara both being recurring actors from Yakuza 3), and Yoko Maki as Kiyomi Kasahara, as well as other artists that have participated in the Yakuza series.

Plot
Recovering from injuries sustained in the previous game, Kazuma Kiryu is arrested for past crimes, and willingly spends three years in prison, hoping for a peaceful life with his fostered children. In his absence, an arson in Kamurocho's Little Asia district skews the criminal underworld's power balance: Daigo Dojima, Taiga Saejima and Goro Majima are framed for the arson and imprisoned; Katsumi Sugai and Takumi Someya usurp the Tojo Clan; the Chinese Saio Triad, specializing in heihaizi human trafficking, rises to power in the area; and the Jingweon Mafia resurfaces, occupying most of Kamurocho. 

Upon release in 2016, Kiryu discovers that Haruka Sawamura hid herself in Onomichi, Hiroshima from the paparazzi after her controversial retirement, and is currently unconscious after being a hit-and-run victim in Kamurocho. Learning that she has an infant son, Haruto, Kiryu travels with the baby to Onomichi. Upon arrival, Kiryu befriends the local Hirose family, its patriarch Toru Hirose, and members Tsuyoshi Nagumo, Naoto Tagashira, Takaaki Matsunaga and Yuta Usami.

Searching for Haruto's father, he meets prominent figures of the Onomichi Yakuza world: Takeru Kurusu, real name Heizo Iwami, chairman of the powerful Yomei alliance, and his son Tsuneo Iwami, CEO of his front company, Iwami Shipbuilding. Kiryu also learns that Sugai and Someya initially provoked the war with the Saio Triad in the Tojo Clan's name, which included burning Little Asia, so that Daigo could be framed and arrested. However, the hostility between the gangs became genuine after Tsuneo Iwami empowered the Saio Triad. Iwami later betrayed them and dispatched the Jingweon Mafia to murder the eldest son of their leader, Big Lo. Iwami and the Saio Triad also share the "secret of Omonichi". Likewise, Sugai and Someya want the Saio Triad suppressed, with the latter requesting support from Kiryu. Kiryu rejects the offer because of his role in framing Daigo.  

Hirose eventually reveals that Yuta is Haruto's father, and the youngest son of Big Lo. From birth, Big Lo's subordinates, Masuzose and Tatsukawa, secretly manipulated Yuta into learning Chinese culture in case his elder brother died, so that he could replace him and reign over the triad, per hereditary succession. After his brother's murder, the Saio Triad attempted to kill Haruto because of his mixed bloodline. However, Tatsukawa and his Jingweon allies decide to sell Haruto to Tsueno, who wants to prove that he has the final authority over them by keeping the child. He convinces Haruka of the plan in Kamurocho but accidentally runs her over during the process. The triad kills Tatsukawa for his treachery. 

Iwami later orders the Jingweon Mafia to kidnap Haruto, who is saved by Kiryu and his allies. Yuta, disgusted by his father's actions, attempts to commit murder-suicide by burning down Little Asia. Kiryu saves them. Big Lo recovers and tells Kiryu that Hirose deliberately told Yuta about his background to provoke him to kill him. This is because Big Lo failed to obey Hirose's command to leave Japan, because of his knowledge of the "secret of Onomichi". Realizing that Hirose had been killing anyone connected to the "Secret", Kiryu returns to Onomichi to confront him; the secret is revealed to be a  intended for use against the American occupation forces, built illegally by Iwami Shipbuilding. The project was funded by Minoru Daidoji, nicknamed the Fixer, a politician who embezzled taxpayer money from Hiroshima citizens. Kurusu appears and reveals that not only did he order Hirose to commit the murders, but that he was the one who thought of the idea in the first place. He orders Hirose to kill Kiryu and the Hirose Family for exposing the secret but Hirose refuses, resulting in his execution. Daidoji names Iwami as his new right-hand man and orders him to execute his father, since he failed to execute Kiryu and his allies. Iwami also announces his plan to fully dominate the Yomei Alliance and Tojo Clan.   

Kiryu invades the Millenium Tower to confront Iwami and Sugai, but is forced to fight Someya. Someya's defeat however led to his ex-wife being held hostage at gunpoint by Iwami and Sugai, forcing him to commit seppuku to save her. Mourning Someya, Kiryu and the Hirose Family mount a full-scale invasion on the Yomei Alliance. In anticipation, Iwami and Sugai kidnap the awoken Haruka and Haruto. The Hirose Family rescues the two, and a heavily wounded Kiryu defeats Iwami, but is shot by Sugai. Iwami is imprisoned, Daidoji dies of old age, and Sugai commits suicide. 

By January 2017, a politician serving as Daidoji's successor attempts to bribe a recovering Kiryu into silence regarding Daidoji's crimes, which would jeopardize several high-profile politicians. In exchange for his silence, Kiryu demands Daigo's release from imprisonment to prevent a war between the Tojo Clan and Yomei Alliance, and has the politician fake his death to ensure that Haruka and her family can live in peace. After their release from prison, Daigo, Saejima, and Majima create an alliance with the Yomei in honor of Kiryu's will.

In the final scene, Kiryu observes the Morning Glory orphanage from a distance, where Haruka, Yuta, Haruto, and his fostered children live peacefully. As Haruto take his first steps, he sees Kiryu, who disappears before anyone else can spot him.

DevelopmentYakuza 6 was announced on September 15, 2015, at the Tokyo Game Show during the Sony conference, exclusively for PlayStation 4 and with a release date of "Autumn 2016". Toshihiro Nagoshi of Sega confirmed that more details would be revealed during the rest of the event. A traditional Chinese localisation was announced for the Asia region. Beat Takeshi was also announced to be playing a character within the game. The game also features New Japan Pro-Wrestling wrestlers Hiroshi Tanahashi, Hiroyoshi Tenzan, Kazuchika Okada, Satoshi Kojima, Tetsuya Naito and Toru Yano, who play fictionalized versions of themselves in the game. In addition, darts player Paul Lim, the first player to score a Nine-dart finish in a world championship appears as himself during a sub-story. He speaks English, only the second time the language is heard in the series.

This is the first game to be developed exclusively for the PlayStation 4, featuring the all new "Dragon Engine".Yakuza 6 also includes Virtua Fighter 5: Final Showdown, Puyo Puyo, Out Run, Super Hang-On, Space Harrier, and Fantasy Zone as playable games in the form of basic play spots. Virtua Fighter 5: Final Showdown and Puyo Puyo include two-player modes as well. Virtua Fighter 5: Final Showdown is based on Version B of the game and Yakuza 6 is the only official release of this version outside Japan.

For Yakuza 6, Kiryu's orphanage, named "Sunshine Orphanage" in previous western releases, was renamed to "Morning Glory" (the literal translation of its Japanese name ). Yakuza series localization director Scott Strichart explained that as Goro Majima had managed a cabaret club called Sunshine in Yakuza 0, it felt too much of a coincidence that both Majima and Kiryu would both come to have a place called "Sunshine" play a big part in their lives. He then said that as such, it would likely lead to the impression that Kiryu had decided to name his orphanage after the cabaret club, which seemed highly inappropriate for his character. This change was retained in later re-releases of prior games.

Demo
The demo for Yakuza 6 was released on February 27, 2018, for North America, Europe, and Australia. The US version was pulled from the PlayStation Store after Sega discovered that they accidentally released the full game in that region. The Australian and European demos were pulled from the PlayStation Store the next day, and all the free copies of the game in the US had their digital license revoked. On March 19, 2018, the demo was re-released on the PlayStation Store.

 Reception 
 Critical response Yakuza 6: The Song of Life'' received "generally favorable" reviews from critics, according to review aggregator Metacritic.

The game received a score of 39/40 from the video game magazine Famitsu. The German magazine 4Players gave it 85 out of 100 points.

Some questioned the inclusion of the chat room mini game where real world AV models strip on successful button prompts. Though acknowledging their presence does truthfully reflect prominent parts of the real-world Japanese nightlife and adult industries, they felt they were inconsistent with the character of Kiryu.

Sales 
In its first week of release in Japan, it sold 218,168 copies. Combined with the rest of Asia, the game shipped over 500,000 units by December 16, 2016. It was the third best selling video game in the United Kingdom during its European debut week, making it the biggest launch for the series in the UK. As of June 2018, the game has sold 800,000-900,000 units worldwide, with overseas markets accounting for approximately half of the game's sales.

Accolades 
The game was nominated for "Best Storytelling" and "PlayStation Game of the Year" at the 2018 Golden Joystick Awards, and for the Tin Pan Alley Award for Best Music in a Game at the New York Game Awards.

Notes

References

External links

2016 video games
Action-adventure games
Fiction about fatherhood
Open-world video games
Organized crime video games
Patricide in fiction
PlayStation 4 games
PlayStation 4 Pro enhanced games
Sega beat 'em ups
Single-player video games
Video game sequels
Video games developed in Japan
Video games set in 2016
Video games set in 2017
Video games set in Hiroshima Prefecture
Video games set in Okinawa Prefecture
Video games set in Tokyo
Windows games
Xbox Cloud Gaming games
Xbox One games
Xbox One X enhanced games
Yakuza (franchise)
Zainichi Korean culture
Video games scored by Hidenori Shoji
Triad (organized crime)
World War II in popular culture